The Egyptian Bloc was an electoral alliance in Egypt. It was formed in August 2011 by several liberal, social democratic, and leftist political parties and movements, as well as the traditional Islamist Sufi Liberation Party to prevent the Muslim Brotherhood, and its affiliated Freedom and Justice Party from winning the parliamentary election in November of that year. As of September 2012, all former constituent parties left the bloc, joined other alliances or merged into other parties.

Establishment
The 15 groups shared the common vision of Egypt as a "civil democratic state", and feared that in case of an Islamist electoral victory the constitution could be changed to an Islamic one.

The establishment of the coalition was publicly announced on 15 August 2011 in Cairo. The assembly's objective is to present a united list of candidates for the parliamentary election, to raise funds and to campaign together. The alliance supports Prime Minister Essam Sharaf's proposal of a "constitutional decree" that could prevent the Islamists from unilaterally amending the constitution or drafting a new one, even in case of winning a parliamentary majority. Analysts see the formation as a "final attempt" of the liberal and secularist camp to cope with the Muslim Brotherhood's advance in Egypt's post-revolutionary political landscape, in respect of organisational structure, profile and publicity.

Platform
The programmatic ambitions of the alliance are to establish Egypt as a modern civil state in which science plays an important role, and to create equality and social justice in the country. The objectives of the Bloc also include to make a decent life possible for the poorer population, including education, health care and proper housing. It advocates a pluralistic, multi-party democracy and rejects religious, racial, and sexual discrimination.

Development
Several leading members of the long-standing national-liberal New Wafd Party have also joined the alliance, even though the party had announced to contest the elections together with the Freedom and Justice Party.

In late October 2011, the Socialist Popular Alliance Party broke away from the Egyptian Bloc, claiming that the bloc contained remnants of the old regime, and formed the Revolution Continues Alliance. The Egyptian Socialist Party followed this example.

By early November, only the Free Egyptians Party, the Egyptian Social Democratic Party, and Tagammu remained components of the alliance.

After the elections of 2011/2012, the ESDP left the Bloc, complaining that the other partners were more concerned over the secular-Islamist divide than over the differences between the former regime and the forces of the revolution. In September 2012, the Tagammu Party joined the Revolutionary Democratic Coalition.

Results of the 2011 Parliamentary elections
In the 2011/2012 parliamentary elections, the Egyptian Bloc won 2,402,238 votes out of 27,065,135 correct votes, or roughly 8.9% of all votes. The Egyptian Bloc thus received 33 seats out of 332 in the Egyptian Parliament. The 33 seats were divided between members of the Bloc as follows:
 Egyptian Social Democratic Party: 16 seats
 Free Egyptians Party: 14 seats
 National Progressive Unionist Party: 3 seats

In addition, one independent candidate belonging to the Free Egyptians Party won one of the 168 seats allocated for independent candidates.

Thus, the Egyptian Bloc won a total of 34 seats out of 500 (6.8%) in the 2012 Egyptian Parliament, thus becoming the fourth largest political block in the parliament.

Shura Council elections
During the Shura council elections in January and February 2012, the bloc was divided considering the question whether or not to participate. The Free Egyptians Party decided to boycott the vote, citing the reluctance of authorities to address irregularities during the lower house elections. The ESDP and Tagammu, on the other hand, insisted on fielding candidates.

Member organisations
Former member organisations
Freedom Egypt Party
Egyptian Communist Party
Democratic Front Party
Awareness Party
Sufi Liberation Party
Socialist Popular Alliance Party (withdrawn in October)
Socialist Party of Egypt (withdrawn in October)
Egyptian Social Democratic Party (withdrawn after the 2011/2012 elections)
Free Egyptians Party
National Progressive Unionist Party (Tagammu)

Social and labour organisations
National Association for Change
 The National Council
 the Farmers' Syndicate
 the Popular Worker's Union

References

2011 establishments in Egypt
2012 disestablishments in Egypt
Defunct political party alliances in Egypt
Liberal parties in Egypt
Political opposition organizations
Organisations of the Egyptian Crisis (2011–2014)
Political parties disestablished in 2012
Political parties established in 2011
Secularism in Egypt